David Madson may refer to:

David Madson, the birth name of Odd Nosdam, (born 1976), American underground hip hop producer, DJ and visual artist
David Madson, victim of the serial killer Andrew Cunanan.